Bolma boucheti is a species of sea snail, a marine gastropod mollusk in the family Turbinidae, the turban snails.

Distribution
This marine species occurs off New Caledonia.

References

 Alf, A. & Kreipl, K., 2011. A new species of Bolma from New Caledonia. Spixiana 34(1): 3-8

External links
 To World Register of Marine Species

boucheti
Gastropods described in 2011